Pickerington Local School District, formerly Violet Township Schools (1905–1939), is a public school district in Ohio. It serves most of the city of Pickerington, Ohio, as well as part of the city of Columbus, Reynoldsburg, Canal Winchester and unincorporated parts of Fairfield and Franklin Counties. In the 1980s and 90s it was the fastest growing school district in Ohio over a five-year period. It is highly rated by Niche. In 2004 the district was rated excellent by the state of Ohio. It is the taxing authority for the Pickerington Public Library as well as for the school district.

Schools

Elementary (K-4)

Middle (5–6)

Junior High (7–8)

High School (9–12)

Other Schools

Career Center

Ohio University Lancaster classes 
In the spring of 2023 Ohio University Lancaster will be offering classes at Pickering North High School. Initially the four topics available are communication, English, philosophy and psychology. They are designed for both Ohio University and high school students. The high school students can obtain credit under the university's Credit Plus program.

Grants 
The district has worked with local partners to obtain a grant from the federally funded Safe Routes to School grant program. In 2012 they received a $460,000 grant from The Ohio Department of Transportation for the program.

November 8, 2022 bond issue 
In the November general election Pickerington Local Schools (PLSD) passed a $89.930 million bond issue aimed at reducing the overcrowding in the school district. It was the third attempt for a bond issue with the first one in November 2020 and May 2021. This proposed bond is about $5 million lower than similar ballot issues that were turned down in November 2020 and May 2021; it took out all of the extracurricular projects. The funds will allow the district to build a third junior high school that will accommodate 1,300 students and renovate Ridgeview Junior High School to convert it into a separate K-4 elementary school and 5th-6th grade middle school. This will create an eighth elementary school for 450 students and a fourth middle school for 450 students. The funds will also help the school purchase and renovate a property on Yarmouth Road to convert in to a preschool building. Upon renovation, the building would house 15 preschool classes that serve four elementary schools.

In the works now, bond proceeds, along with some previously allocated General Funds, will be used to:

 Construct McGill Junior High School, located at the McGill property. Construction will also include bleachers, concession stands, two locker rooms, a press box, parking and a roadway to accommodate the new junior high's athletic teams.
 Renovate Ridgeview Junior High School.
 Central High School — add classrooms, expand the cafeteria, renovate the courtyard, add turf and a baseball field with dugouts.
 North High School — add classrooms, renovate the courtyard, add turf and a softball field with dugouts.
 Add flexible furniture throughout other schools.
 Relocate PLSD's Technology Department into Heritage Elementary.
 Renovate the existing building on Yarmouth Road to be used for preschool classrooms.

References

School districts in Ohio
School districts established in 1905
Education in Fairfield County, Ohio
Education in Franklin County, Ohio